Nicola Bellomo (born 18 February 1991) is an Italian professional footballer who plays for  club Bari.

Club career

Bari 
Born in Bari, he began his football career with hometown club A.S. Bari, entering the youth system. He made his debut at the end of the 2008–09 Serie B season, on 16 May 2009, replacing Daniele De Vezze in a 4–1 win against Modena. He was confirmed for the first team the following season, but never played, instead he continued to play with the youth team.

In July 2010, he was loaned to Lucchese along with Alessandro Marotta, but in August moved to Barletta. He played the league first match as substitute, replaced defender Alessio Lanotte (that match Barletta played a 4-3-3 formation) and started as the attacking midfielder in the next round (4-3-1-2 formation). He was the playmaker in 4-3-1-2 formation or one of the supporting striker in 4-3-2-1 formation.

On 1 July 2011 he signed a new 3-year contract with Bari.

Chievo and return to Bari
On 27 August 2012, half of the registration rights of Bellomo was sold to Chievo for €1.75 million (€350,000 cash plus half of the registration rights of Andrea De Falco). Bellomo immediately returned to Bari in temporary deal.

Torino 
On 3 July 2013 Bellomo was sold to Serie A club Torino for €1.2 million with Chievo retaining 50% of his registration rights in co-ownership. He made his debut for the Granata during the third round of the 2013–14 Coppa Italia against Pescara, lost 1–2, and in Serie A on 25 September playing a full match against Hellas Verona, 2–2. On 20 October he scored his first goal in Serie A from a free kick to draw Torino level against Inter Milan in the 90th minute and the match ended 3–3. In a post-match interview Bellomo dedicated the goal to his late father.

Bellomo made 7 appearances for Torino during the 2013–14 season before he was loaned to Spezia in Serie B on 29 January 2014.

Spezia (loan)

At Spezia, he was given the number 10 shirt, making his debut 1 February 2014 in a draw 1–1 against Juve Stabia. After contributing two assists on 15 February at home against Crotone (3–1), he scored his first goal for the Aquilotti on 22 March against Brescia (won 2–0). He scored again on 12 April away to Cesena (2–0), before deciding the following match against Siena, 1–0. He was decisive again on 3 May, scoring the 2–1 against Regina, bringing Spezia into the play-off zone of the league table. With Spezia, he played in the quarter-finals of the promotional play-offs, losing 1–0 to Modena. He concluded the season with 21 appearances and 5 goals.

Return to Chievo
On 21 June 2014 the co-ownership between Chievo and Torino was resolved in favour of the former for a fee of €343,000.

Bari (loan)
On 29 January 2015 Bellomo returned to Bari for the remainder of 2014–15 Serie B season.

Ascoli (loan)
On 21 September 2015 Bellomo joined Serie B newcomer Ascoli.

Vicenza (loan)
On 21 January 2016 Bellomo was signed by Vicenza on loan for  seasons.

Return to Bari
On 26 July 2022, Bellomo returned to Bari on a two-year contract.

International career 

After several call-ups to Italy U18, with whom, he failed to play, he debuted for the Italy U19 on 22 September 2009 in a friendly match lost 4–1 against Denmark. On 9 February 2011, he played for the Italy U20 in a game lost 3–1 against Germany (of the same age group). In April 2013, he was called up to the Italy U21 (along with teammates Francesco Fedato and Stefano Sabelli) by coach Devis Mangia in view of the 2013 UEFA European Under-21 Championship in Israel.

He has also represented the Italy under-21 Serie B representative team, replacing Fabrizio Paghera against a Russian First League selection. From 10–12 March 2014, he was called up by the head coach of the senior national team, Cesare Prandelli, in order to evaluate young players ahead of the 2014 World Cup.

Style of play
Bellomo began as a central midfielder, but in recent seasons at Bari was often employed in a playmaking role. He is right footed, with a good shot from distance and competent at set pieces. Said to be inspired by Marco Verratti.

Honours

Club
Bari
 Serie B (1): 2009

References

External links
 FIGC national team data 
 
 Football.it Profile 

1991 births
Footballers from Bari
Living people
Italian footballers
Italy youth international footballers
Association football midfielders
S.S.C. Bari players
S.S.D. Lucchese 1905 players
A.S.D. Barletta 1922 players
A.C. ChievoVerona players
Torino F.C. players
Spezia Calcio players
Ascoli Calcio 1898 F.C. players
L.R. Vicenza players
U.S. Alessandria Calcio 1912 players
A.S. Sambenedettese players
U.S. Salernitana 1919 players
Reggina 1914 players
Serie A players
Serie B players
Serie C players